Ichii (written: 市井) is a Japanese surname. Notable people with the surname include:

, Japanese professional wrestler, mixed martial artist and kickboxer
, Japanese singer and idol
, Japanese singer and idol

Fictional characters
, a character in the manga series A Channel
, a character in the manga series Yuyushiki

Japanese-language surnames